Pedro Peña y Lillo (24 March 1902 – 4 May 1969) was a Chilean sports shooter. He competed in the 25 m pistol event at the 1948 Summer Olympics.

References

External links
 

1902 births
1969 deaths
Chilean male sport shooters
Olympic shooters of Chile
Shooters at the 1948 Summer Olympics
Place of birth missing
20th-century Chilean people